Hurtan Desarrollos S.L., also known as Hurtan Automóviles, is a Spanish automobile company, founded in 1991 by Juan Hurtado González.

The company is based in Santa Fe, near Granada.  It is an automobile manufacturer of retro-styled vehicles.

Models
The company's models, inspired by classic sports cars of the 1950s and 60s, include:
 Albaycín T2 — introduced 1992, 2 seat sports car.
 Albaycín T2+2 — introduced 1996, 4 seat sports car.
 Albaycín 2P — introduced 2004, sports car.
 Albaycín 4P — introduced 2006, roadster.
 Grand Albaycín — introduced 2008, sports car.
 Author — introduced 2017, luxury coupe.
 Route44 — introduced 2017, commercial vehicle, custom configured for different business types (e.g. foodtruck, mobile office or retail store).
 Vintage — introduced 2019, a Jeep Wrangler-based car with "1930s look".
 Grand Albaycin 30th Anniversary — introduced 2022, a Mazda MX-5 (ND)-based car with 1950 – 1960s look.

Velántur Cars
Hurtan designed the retro−coupe bodies for the luxury electric Velántur Cars company, a joint venture of Retrofactory, another Hurtado family business, and Jofemar Corporation of Navarra. It will be the first 100% electric powered luxury vehicle produced in Spain. The battery electric vehicles will be manufactured at the former Santana Motor factory in Linares, in the Province of Jaén, Andalusia.

Gallery

See also

References

External links
Official Hurtan website—

Electric vehicle manufacturers of Spain
Car manufacturers of Spain
Retro-style automobiles
Sports car manufacturers
Battery electric vehicle manufacturers
Luxury motor vehicle manufacturers
Companies of Andalusia
Province of Granada
Spanish companies established in 1991
Vehicle manufacturing companies established in 1991
Spanish brands